Marcis Auto Racing is a former NASCAR Winston Cup team. It was owned and operated by former NASCAR driver Dave Marcis.

Winston Cup
The highlight of Marcis' career as an owner-driver was winning at the old Richmond Fairgrounds in 1982 driving a very un-raceable looking 71 Chevy Malibu, sponsored by J. D. Stacy. Marcis was a lap down, but made up the lap when the race leader Joe Ruttman spun out and Marcis passed him. All three drivers that were ahead of Marcis pitted and he assumed the lead as it began to rain. The race was called complete as darkness set in, and Marcis was declared the winner. Marcis described the win, "I wasn't praying for rain, but I told the guys when I got out of the car (during the break before the race was canceled) that if the good Lord wanted to help an independent, this was his chance." "It was one of my greatest moments in racing," Marcis said. "I had even built my own engine for that race."

References

External links

Defunct NASCAR teams
Auto racing teams established in 1969
Auto racing teams disestablished in 2002